Eugenio Rossi may refer to:

Eugenio Rossi (athlete) (born 1992), Sammarinese athlete
Eugenio Rossi (tennis) (born 1969), Italian tennis player